"I Like It" is the second single by Liverpudlian band Gerry and the Pacemakers. Like Gerry Marsden's first number one "How Do You Do It", it was written by Mitch Murray. The song reached number one in the UK Singles Chart on 20 June 1963, where it stayed for four weeks. It reached No. 17 in the American charts in 1964.

Cash Box described it as "a happy-go-lucky jump'er that Gerry [Marsden] solo vocals in ear-arresting style."

References

External links
Gerry Marsden official site
Classic Bands history page

1963 singles
Gerry and the Pacemakers songs
Song recordings produced by George Martin
UK Singles Chart number-one singles
Irish Singles Chart number-one singles
Songs written by Mitch Murray
1963 songs
Columbia Graphophone Company singles